"Bootylicious" is a song recorded by American group Destiny's Child for their third studio album Survivor (2001). It was written and produced by Rob Fusari, Beyoncé and Falonte Moore. The song contains a prominent sample from Stevie Nicks' song "Edge of Seventeen". It was released as the second single from Survivor on May 22, 2001, by Columbia Records.

"Bootylicious" was a commercial success, becoming the group's fourth and final US Billboard Hot 100 number-one single. It also reached the top five in Australia, Canada, the Netherlands and the United Kingdom. A Rockwilder remix of the song featured Missy Elliott and appeared on the soundtrack of the 2001 musical Carmen: A Hip Hopera and the group's remix album This Is the Remix (2002).

Although the term "bootylicious" had already been used by rapper Snoop Dogg in Dr. Dre's song "Dre Day" (1992), the popularity of "Bootylicious" caused the slang word to become widespread, being added to the Oxford English Dictionary in 2004 under the definition "(of a woman) sexually attractive".

Writing and production 
"Bootylicious" was written and produced by Beyoncé, Rob Fusari and Falonte Moore, and was recorded at SugarHill Studios in Houston, and Sound on Sound Studios in New York City. There are conflicting stories about the song's origins. According to Knowles, she was inspired to write the song on a flight to either London or Japan as she was listening to the guitar riff of Stevie Nicks' song "Edge of Seventeen", which reminded her of a "voluptuous woman". According to Fusari, he wanted to build a track on a sample of Survivor's "Eye of the Tiger". Unable to locate the song, he chose to sample "Edge of Seventeen" instead. He wanted to replay the guitar riff himself in the studio so as not to lose publishing royalties, but group manager Mathew Knowles (father of Beyoncé Knowles) would not let him do this.

Music
According to the sheet music published by EMI Music Publishing at Musicnotes.com, "Bootylicious" is a pop song set in common time with a medium funk tempo of 104 beats per minute. It is written in the key of E minor (recorded in D minor), and Destiny's Child's vocals span from G3 to B5. Rowland sings the majority of the lead vocals on the track, with her leading both verses, Knowles leading choruses, and Michelle Williams leading the bridge.

Remixes 
A hip hop-styled remix (the Rockwilder remix) was produced by Rockwilder, Knowles, and Missy Elliott. This version was issued to urban markets, and had a hip-hop culture-based music video to accompany it, in which Beyoncé wears a belt that has the word "Bootylicious" misspelled as "Bootyliciuos", as pointed out by Carson Daly on an episode of TRL.

A combination of the R&B vocals from this song and the grunge rock music of Nirvana's "Smells Like Teen Spirit" is one of the best-known examples of the "bastard pop" or "mashup" genre, where elements from seemingly incompatible songs are mixed together. A later mashup used the music of Stevie Wonder's "Superstition" with the "Bootylicious" vocals.

Music video 
The music video for "Bootylicious", directed by Matthew Rolston and filmed from May 7–9, 2001, showed Destiny's Child performing dance steps from Michael Jackson's famous "Billie Jean" performance from the special Motown 25: Yesterday, Today, Forever. During the video, moves from several other Michael Jackson videos can be seen such as parts of the choreography from "Thriller", "Beat It", "Bad", and "The Way You Make Me Feel". Dance moves that were used by Jackson during live performances of "They Don't Care About Us" can be seen as well.

As the group is dancing, the members appear in several different costumes. These scenes are interloped with the group dancing in front of a dance troupe made of all boys. The dance sequence ends with a diamond-shaped stage where the group appears wearing pink crop-tops, while the all-male dance troupe appears shirtless, wearing Michael Jackson's signature one glove and sagging pants that showed their underwear with "Destiny" at the back. Legendary musician Stevie Nicks is featured playing the sampled riff on her guitar in the 'Kelly can you handle this, Michelle can you handle this; intro of the song. Nicks said while shooting the music video 'I got to sit there with them and hang out with them all day long ... We had a great day,' she noted. Solange Knowles, Beyoncé's sister, also makes a brief cameo in the video.

The version of the song featured in the music video is slightly different from the album version, removing the synth strings and DJ scratching and percussion fills in favour of a drier mix, with the bass guitar cut out part-way through the final choruses and a fade-out of the instrumental leaving only the vocals near the end. This version was never commercially released.

The music clip is featured on the DualDisc edition of the album #1's and as an enhanced video on the UK and French editions of the single. The video for the Rockwilder remix featuring Missy Elliott is available on the "Urban Remixes" version of the UK CD single for "Emotion".

Live performances 
Destiny's Child opened the inaugural BET Awards (2001) with a performance of "Bootylicious". They also performed it on both Michael Jackson: 30th Anniversary Special concerts, complete with their rendition of his dance moves. Before the video's premiere, the group had dedicated the video to Michael Jackson. According to Kelly Rowland, Jackson liked the song so much that when he saw them for the first time, he started to sing it and they were very surprised. On February 3, 2013, Beyoncé performed the song along with Rowland and Williams during the Super Bowl XLVII halftime show. They also performed Beyonce's "Single Ladies (Put a Ring on It)".

Commercial performance 
"Bootylicious" debuted at number 66 on the US Billboard Hot 100 on June 9, 2001. Nine weeks later, the song reached number one, becoming the group's fourth and final number-one single in the United States. It remained on the chart for 19 additional weeks. As of 2022, it remains the last song by a girl group to top the Billboard Hot 100. The song also peaked at number five on the Hot 100 Airplay chart and number two on the Hot 100 Singles Sales chart, behind Mariah Carey's "Loverboy".

In the United Kingdom, "Bootylicious" debuted and peaked at number two on the UK Singles Chart, behind the Atomic Kitten's "Eternal Flame". It sold over 169,000 copies and propelled Survivor back to the top of the UK Albums Chart. Additionally, the song reached the top ten in several other countries, including Australia, Canada, Ireland, the Netherlands, New Zealand, Norway, and Sweden.

Impact and legacy 
"Bootylicious" created moderate controversy due to pushing the boundaries of female sexuality. Destiny's Child was claiming "G-rated fun" and confidence in body image through the lyrics, yet the song's music video suggested much more with the group wearing heavy make-up, form-fitting clothes, performing sexually suggestive dancing, and the video featuring close-ups on several dancers' buttocks. The song popularized the portmanteau term "bootylicious", a combination of the words "booty" and "delicious", although the term had already been used by Snoop Dogg in the song "Fuck wit Dre Day (And Everybody's Celebratin')" (aka "Dre Day" from Dr. Dre's 1992 album The Chronic) as a pejorative. "Bootylicious" is also mentioned by a character named Champ in the 1993 "Homey, Don't Ya Know Me?" episode of A Different World. The term was also used previously in the 1999 video game Duke Nukem: Time to Kill as the name of a strip club.

The success of the song came after the rise in media visibility of voluptuous personalities such as Jennifer Lopez. There was a media perception that the appearance of these women corresponded to an appreciation of the supposedly neglected larger hips and thighs common in the figures of black and Latina women. The approving neologism "bootylicious" has entered the mainstream English language as part of the crossover of African-American popular culture, fashion, and sexual politics. In September 2011, VH1 ranked "Bootylicious" at number 19 on its list "The 100 Greatest Songs of the 2000s". Rowland has mentioned that "Bootylicious" is the most irritating Destiny's Child song to her since she has heard it too many times.

Track listings 

US CD single
 "Bootylicious" (album version) – 3:27
 "Bootylicious" (Richard Vission's V-Quest) – 6:06

US and Canadian maxi-CD single
 "Bootylicious" (album version) – 3:27
 "Bootylicious" (Richard Vission's V-Quest) – 6:06
 "Bootylicious" (Richard Vission's D.J. dub) – 5:27
 "Bootylicious" (Big Boyz remix) – 3:28
 "Bootylicious" (Case remix) – 4:45

US 12-inch single
A1. "Bootylicious" (Richard Vission's V-Quest) – 6:06
A2. "Bootylicious" (Richard Vission's D.J. dub) – 5:27
B1. "Bootylicious" (Big Boyz remix) – 3:28
B2. "Bootylicious" (Big Boyz remix instrumental) – 3:24
B3. "Bootylicious" (album version) – 3:27
B4. "Bootylicious" (album instrumental) – 3:27

UK CD single
 "Bootylicious" (album version) – 3:27
 "Bootylicious" (Ed Case refix) – 4:45
 "Cards Never Lie" – 2:42
 "Bootylicious" (video)

UK cassette single
 "Bootylicious" (album version) – 3:27
 "Bootylicious" (M and J's Jelly remix) – 3:40

UK 12-inch single
A1. "Bootylicious" (album version) – 3:27
A2. "Bootylicious" (Rockwilder remix featuring Missy Elliott) – 4:13
B1. "Bootylicious" (Ed Case refix) – 4:45

European CD1
 "Bootylicious" (album version) – 3:27
 "Bootylicious" (Ed Case refix) – 4:45

European CD2
 "Bootylicious" (album version) – 3:27
 "Bootylicious" (Ed Case refix) – 4:45
 "Bootylicious" (M&J's Jelly remix) – 3:40
 "Bootylicious" (video version)

Australian CD single
 "Bootylicious" – 3:27
 "Survivor" (Jameson full vocal remix) – 6:19
 "Survivor" (Digital Black-N-Groove) – 4:00
 "Survivor" (CB200 Club Anthem mix) – 6:20
 "Independent Women Part 1" (live at The Brits 2001)

Japanese CD single
 "Bootylicious" (raido edit) – 3:01
 "Bootylicious" (Rockwilder remix) – 3:53
 "Bootylicious" (Richard Vission's V-Quest) – 6:07
 "Bootylicious" (M&J's Jelly remix) – 3:40
 "Bootylicious" (Big Boyz remix) – 3:30

Credits and personnel 
Credits are lifted from the liner notes of #1's.
 Beyoncé Knowles – vocals, writer, producer
 Kelly Rowland – Lead vocals
 Michelle Williams – vocals, mixing
 Rob Fusari – writer, producer
 Falonte Moore – writer, producer
 Stevie Nicks – writer
 Dan Workman – engineering
 Tony Maserati – mixing
 Flip Osman – mixing assistance

Charts

Weekly charts

Year-end charts

Certifications

Release history

In popular culture

Cover versions 
English rock band Keane performed a medley consisting of "Bootylicious" and Christina Aguilera's "Dirrty" on Jo Whiley's Live Lounge. An audio recording is available on Radio 1's Live Lounge – Volume 2. The cast of the Fox television show Glee performed a cover version in the episode "Hairography". The Green Bay Packers covered the song in Pitch Perfect 2.

Use in commercials 
"Bootylicious" was used in a commercial for the video game Candy Crush Jelly Saga in 2016.

In other media 
It appeared on the season 11 finale of drag queen reality competition RuPaul's Drag Race, where contestants Brooke Lynn Hytes and Silky Nutmeg Ganache had to lipsync to it in order to advance to the final round.

The song appeared in Disney and Pixar's 2022 animated film Turning Red.

See also 
 List of Billboard Hot 100 number ones of 2001
 List of UK R&B Singles Chart number ones of 2001

References

External links 
 
 

1992 neologisms
2001 singles
2001 songs
American funk songs
Billboard Hot 100 number-one singles
Columbia Records singles
Destiny's Child songs
Missy Elliott songs
Music videos directed by Matthew Rolston
Song recordings produced by Beyoncé
Songs written by Beyoncé
Songs written by Kelly Rowland
Songs written by Rob Fusari
Songs written by Stevie Nicks